Proliferation-associated protein 2G4 (PA2G4) also known as ErbB3-binding protein 1 (EBP1) is a protein that in humans is encoded by the PA2G4 gene.

Function 

This gene encodes an RNA-binding protein that is involved in growth regulation. This protein is present in pre-ribosomal ribonucleoprotein complexes and may be involved in ribosome assembly and the regulation of intermediate and late steps of rRNA processing. This protein can interact with the cytoplasmic domain of the ErbB3 receptor and may contribute to transducing growth regulatory signals. This protein is also a transcriptional corepressor of androgen receptor-regulated genes and other cell cycle regulatory genes through its interactions with histone deacetylases. This protein has been implicated in growth inhibition and the induction of differentiation of human cancer cells. Paradoxically, the expression of EBP1 is decreased in prostate cancer, but increased in Acute Myelogneous Leukemia. Six pseudogenes, located on chromosomes 3, 6, 9, 18, 20 and X, have been identified.

Interactions 

PA2G4 has been shown to interact with ERBB3, retinoblastoma protein, and androgen receptor.

References

Further reading